The Cathedral of Our Lady of the Assumption in Sé, Funchal, Madeira, Portugal, is the cathedral of the Roman Catholic Diocese of Funchal, which encompasses all of the Autonomous Region of Madeira. The late fifteenth-century cathedral is one of the few structures that survives virtually intact since the early period of colonization of Madeira. The patron of the cathedral is Our Lady of the Assumption.

Design and artwork
The cathedral is designed in a Gothic style and has three naves. The building was constructed using thousands of blocks of volcanic rocks carried from the cliffs at Cabo Girão, namely trachybasalt, trachyandesite, trachyte, tephrite and ashes, lapilli and breccia tuff. The facades are predominantly plastered and painted white, with stonework corners.

The roof of the cathedral features a Mudéjar-inspired design and is of cedar wood. 
The wooden choir stalls depict prophets, saints and apostles in 16th-century garb. In the decorative details of the seats and armrests, aspects of Madeira's life can also be seen, such as cherubs carrying a bunch of bananas or a wineskin.

The cathedral contains a silver processional cross donated by King Manuel I of Portugal, considered one of the masterpieces of Manueline liturgical silverwork.

As Pope John Paul II visited Madeira in 1991, a statue of Pope was built to remember the event. It is located outside the cathedral, which was moved to its current position after formerly being installed in the urban area of Funchal adjacent to the waterfront.

History
During the 1490s, Manuel I sent architect Pêro Anes or Gil Enes to work on the design of the Cathedral of Funchal. The cathedral was structurally complete in 1514. Prior to completion, however, by 1508, when Funchal was elevated to the status of a city, the cathedral was already being used for the celebration of Mass. The spire of the bell tower and a few additional details were finalized in 1517-1518.

References

External links

 Diocese of Funchal - Information about the Cathedral
 Cathedral of Our Lady of the Assumption - gcatholic
 Diocese do Funchal - Catholic Encyclopedia

1514 establishments in Portugal
Roman Catholic churches completed in 1514
Funchal
Churches in Madeira
Mudéjar architecture
Buildings and structures in Funchal
Tourist attractions in Funchal
Gothic architecture in Portugal
16th-century Roman Catholic church buildings in Portugal